The Laguna Provincial Board is the Sangguniang Panlalawigan (provincial legislature) of the Philippine province of Laguna.

The members are elected via plurality-at-large voting: the province is divided into four legislative districts, the first and the second sending three members each and the third and fourth sending two members each; the number of the members the electorate votes depends on the number of members their district sends. The candidates with the highest number of votes in each district, depending on the number of members the district sends, are elected

The districts used in appropriation of members is coextensive with the legislative districts of Laguna.

List of members
An additional two ex officio members are the presidents of the provincial chapter of the Association of Barangay Captains and the Sangguniang Kabataan provincial president; the municipal and city (if applicable) presidents of the Association of Barangay Captains, and Sangguniang Kabataan, shall elect amongst themselves their provincial presidents which shall be their representatives at the board.

Vice Governor

Notes:

1st District
Cities: Biñan, Santa Rosa City, San Pedro City 
Population (2020): 1,148,250

2nd District
Cities: Cabuyao, Calamba
Municipality: Bay, Los Baños
Population (2020): 1,077,536

3rd District
Cities: San Pablo City
Municipalities: Alaminos, Calauan, Liliw. Nagcarlan, Rizal, Victoria
Population (2020): 590,757

Notes:

4th District
Municipalities: Cavinti, Famy, Kalayaan, Luisiana, Lumban, Mabitac, Magdalena, Majayjay, Paete, Pagsanjan, Pakil, Pangil, Pila, Santa Cruz, Santa Maria, Siniloan
Population (2020): 565,650

Philippine Councilor's League President

Liga ng mga Barangay President

SK Provincial Federation President

References

External links
 Official Website of the Province of Laguna

Provincial boards in the Philippines
Government of Laguna (province)